Each year the Miss Georgia Basketball award is given to the person chosen as the best high school girls basketball player in the U.S. state of Georgia.  The award winner is selected by members of the Atlanta Tip Off Club.

Award winners

See also
Mr. Georgia Basketball

References

Mr. and Miss Basketball awards
Women's sports in Georgia (U.S. state)
Lists of people from Georgia (U.S. state)
Basketball players from Georgia (U.S. state)
American women's basketball players
Sportspeople from Georgia (U.S. state)
Miss Georgia Basketball